The 2009–10 Senior Women's T20 League was the 2nd edition of the women's Twenty20 cricket competition in India. It took place in November and December 2009, with 26 teams divided into five regional groups. Railways won the tournament, beating Maharashtra in the final.

Competition format
The 26 teams competing in the tournament were divided into five zonal groups: Central, East, North, South and West. The tournament operated on a round-robin format, with each team playing every other team in their group once. The top two sides from each group progressed to the Super League round, where the 10 remaining teams were divided into two further round-robin groups. The winner of each group progressed to the final. Matches were played using a Twenty20 format.

The groups worked on a points system with positions with the groups being based on the total points. Points were awarded as follows:

Win: 4 points. 
Tie: 2 points. 
Loss: 0 points. 
No Result/Abandoned: 2 points.

If points in the final table are equal, teams are separated by most wins, then head-to-head record, then Net Run Rate.

Zonal Tables

Central Zone

East Zone

North Zone

South Zone

West Zone

Source:CricketArchive

Super Leagues

Super League Group A

Super League Group B

Source:CricketArchive

Final

Statistics

Most runs

Source: CricketArchive

Most wickets

Source: CricketArchive

References

Women's Senior T20 Trophy
Senior Women's T20 League
Senior Women's T20 League